The California NanoSystems Institute (CNSI) is an integrated research center operating jointly at UCLA and UC Santa Barbara. Its missions are to foster interdisciplinary collaborations for discoveries in nanosystems and nanotechnology; train the next generation of scientists, educators and technology leaders; and facilitate partnerships with industry, fueling economic development and the social well-being of California, the United States and the world.

CNSI was created by Governor Gray Davis as part of a science and innovation initiative, it was established in 2000 with $100 million from the state of California and an additional $250 million in federal research grants and industry funding. At the institute, scientists in the areas of biology, chemistry, biochemistry, physics, mathematics, computational science and engineering measure, modify and manipulate the building blocks of our world – atoms and molecules. These scientists benefit from an integrated laboratory culture enabling them to conduct dynamic research at the nanoscale, leading to significant breakthroughs in the areas of health, energy, the environment and information technology.

History 
On December 7, 2000, California Governor Gray Davis announced the location of the federally sponsored California NanoSystems Institute section of the California Institutes for Science and Innovation (Cal ISI) initiative. The California legislature put forth $100 million for  three research facilities to advance the future of the state's economy. The California NanoSystems Institute (CNSI) was selected out of the proposals along with three other Cal ISIs: California Institute for Quantitative Biosciences (QB3), California Institute for Telecommunications and Information Technology (Cal-(IT)2), and Center for Information Technology Research in the Interest of Society (CITRIS). 
In August, 2000, CNSI was founded on both campuses of UCSB and UCLA. Martha Krebs, the former director of the U.S. Department of Energy's Office of Science, was named the founder.

Active leaders

UCLA 
The people in charge of UCLA CNSI fall into two categories: directors and associate directors.

Directorship 
Jeff F. Miller, Ph.D. - Director

Associate Directors 
Heather Maynard, Ph.D. - Associate Director of Technology & Development
Andre Nel, M.B., CH.B., Ph.D. - Associate Director of Research
Aydogan Ozcan, Ph.D. - Associate Director of Entrepreneurship, Industry and Academic Exchange
Leonard H. Rome, Ph.D. - Associate Director of Facilities Management
Adam Z. Stieg, Ph.D. - Associate Director of Technology Centers

UCSB 
The people in charge of UCSB CNSI fall into two categories: administrative staff and the faculty.

Directorship
Craig Hawker - Director
Javier Read de Alaniz - Associate Director
Megan Valentine - Associate Director
Stephen Wilson - Associate Director

Administrative staff 
Holly Woo - Assistant Director, Administration
Eva Deloa - Financial Manager
Bob Hanson - Building Manager
The building manager is responsible for the maintenance, facility resource leads, and infrastructure of CNSI. The building manager oversees any changes in infrastructure or maintenance to the labs or the building as a whole.

Biology and biomedical 
The research fields of nanobiology (nanobiotechnology) and biomedicine show promise in the connection of nanoscale science to biological/nonbiological matter. New diagnostic methods as well as new ways to administer increasingly efficient disease specific treatments are also being researched and developed.

Energy efficiency 
Nanotechnology has promise to help fight global warming. Nanoscale research can promise more efficient, less wasteful technologies. Also, nanoscale allows to control, transform and store energy more efficiently.

Information technologies 
Both UCLA and UCSB CNSI labs show potential to develop upgrades in the processing, storage, and transmission of information as well as increases in the speed of information processing.

Partnerships 
The California NanoSystems Institute depends on partnerships with technological companies to help fund and run its research facilities. Partnerships fund the operation and expansions of CNSI in addition to the $250 million government research grants received in 2000. Increasing numbers of partnerships were created due to budget cuts by the state.

UCLA 
CNSI has international partnerships with the Chinese Academy of Sciences, the Beijing Nano Center, the University of Tokyo, the University of Kyoto, Kyushu University, Yonsei University, Seoul National University, KAIST, University of Bristol, and Zhejiang University.

Founding partners
Partners that joined when the institute was originally created include:
Abraxis BioScience
BASF The Chemical Company
Intel
HP

Associate partners
Partners that joined after creation include:
NEC
Solarmer Energy, Inc.
Keithley Instruments Company
Photron

UCSB 
Applied Materials
Hewlett-Packard Labs
Intel
Microsoft Research
Sputtered Films / Tegal Corporation
Sun Microsystems
VEECO

Educational opportunities

K-12 
Both campuses offer several educational opportunities including hands-on laboratory research experience for junior high students and their teachers.  These activities are done in collaboration with graduate students doing research in similar fields. UCSB scientists and researchers run family science nights at local junior highs to give families the opportunity to participate in scientific activities with their children. along with after-school engineering and science club for grades 3–8 to explore science with UCSB undergrad club leaders. CNSI also hosts research opportunities for high school juniors and local Santa Barbara teachers on the UCSB campus. In addition, CNSI at UCSB holds a summer program called SIMS (Summer Institute of Math and Science) for incoming freshmen.

Undergraduate 
Both UCLA and UCSB contribute to various scholarships for incoming freshmen. They offer undergraduate courses that give insight to all fields and majors of math and science. Undergraduates have the opportunity to act as club leaders and mentors to younger ages in grades K-12. Undergraduates also have extensive research opportunities in several fields during the year and through summer on either campus. Students within CNSI's UCSB affiliation, UCSB Department of Electrical and Computer Engineering, can choose to intern or volunteer at the institute for lab experience.

Graduate 
Graduate opportunities are limited to:
 Mentoring:
community college students
incoming freshmen
high school juniors
high school teachers
undergraduates
Assisting researchers in the lab

See also
AlloSphere
Scientists, Technologists and Artists Generating Exploration (STAGE)
Incubator Program

References

External links

California NanoSystems Institute - CNSI UCLA chapter (main)
California NanoSystems Institute - CNSI UCSB chapter

Nanotechnology institutions
NanoSystems Institute
University of California, Los Angeles
University of California, Santa Barbara
2000 establishments in California